King Krause (German: König Krause) is a 1919 German silent comedy film directed by Heinrich Bolten-Baeckers.

Cast
In alphabetical order
 Conrad Dreher
 Lilly Flohr
 Sabine Impekoven
 Fritz Lion
 Richard Ludwig
 Annemarie Mörike
 Melita Petri
 Leo Peukert
 Hans Stock

References

Bibliography
 Michael Töteberg. Das Ufa-Buch. Zweitausendeins, 1992.

External links

1919 films
Films of the Weimar Republic
German silent feature films
Films directed by Heinrich Bolten-Baeckers
German comedy films
1919 comedy films
UFA GmbH films
German black-and-white films
Silent comedy films
1910s German films